Xestia smithii, or Smith's dart, is a moth of the family Noctuidae. The species was first described by Pieter Cornelius Tobias Snellen in 1896. It is found across northern North America from Newfoundland to Alaska. In the eastern United States it occurs from Maine to Virginia and south along the Appalachians to North Carolina. In the west it is found in the Black Hills in western South Dakota and north-eastern Wyoming, in the Rocky Mountains from Montana to New Mexico, south-eastern Arizona, and from Washington to east central California. It has recently been recorded from Tennessee.

The dotted clay (X. baja) seems to be closely related, and X. smithii might simply be a Nearctic subspecies of it.

The wingspan is 35–40 mm. Adults are on wing from June to October. There is one generation per year.

The larvae feed on various herbaceous and woody plants, including Fragaria virginiana, Rubus idaeus, Malus, Alnus, Sambucus nigra and Viola. Larvae have been known to cause serious damage to strawberry crops in Washington.

References

Pogue, Michael G. (2006). "The Noctuinae (Lepidoptera: Noctuidae) of Great Smoky Mountains National Park, U.S.A." Zootaxa. 1215: 1-95. .

Xestia
Moths of North America